Wilhelmus Bernhard Henricus Josephus "Wim" van de Donk (born 17 May 1962) is a Dutch former politician and former academic, who served as the King's Commissioner of North Brabant from 1 October 2009 to 1 October 2020. He is a member of the Christian Democratic Appeal (Christen-Democratisch Appèl, CDA). He has been presiding Tilburg University since 19 November 2020.

Born in Veghel, Van de Donk studied public administration at the Radboud University Nijmegen and Tilburg University. He, among others, worked at the Ministry of Justice. From 1999 to 2009 he was public administration professor at Tilburg University; from 2004 to 2009 he also was president of the Dutch Scientific Council for Government Policy (Wetenschappelijke Raad voor het Regeringsbeleid).

Wim van de Donk is married and has two daughters. He is a member of the Roman Catholic Church.

References 
  Parlement.com biography

External links 
  Professor Wim van de Donk appointed as Rector Magnificus and President of the Executive Board, Tilburg University, 27 October 2020

1962 births
Living people
Christian Democratic Appeal politicians
Dutch civil servants
Dutch public administration scholars
Dutch Roman Catholics
Directors of the Scientific Council for Government Policy
People from North Brabant
People from Veghel
King's and Queen's Commissioners of North Brabant
Rectors of universities in the Netherlands
Radboud University Nijmegen alumni
Tilburg University alumni
Academic staff of Tilburg University